Thomas William Ozlin (July 12, 1884 – July 14, 1944) was a Virginia politician. He represented Lunenburg County in the Virginia House of Delegates, and served as that body's Speaker from 1926 until 1930.

References

External links
 
 

Members of the Virginia House of Delegates
Speakers of the Virginia House of Delegates
People from Lunenburg County, Virginia
1884 births
1944 deaths
20th-century American politicians